The 2010 Wyoming Cowboys football team represented the University of Wyoming in the 2010 NCAA Division I FBS football season. They finished the season with a record of 3–9 (1–7 MWC). The team was coached by second year head coach Dave Christensen and played their home games in War Memorial Stadium in Laramie, Wyoming. They played in the Mountain West Conference.

Schedule
The 2010 team played the following games:

References

Wyoming
Wyoming Cowboys football seasons
Wyoming Cowboys football